Statistics of UAE Football League in season 1976/77.

Overview
Al Ain FC won the championship.

References
United Arab Emirates - List of final tables (RSSSF)

UAE Pro League seasons
1
Emir